Washington Gardens may refer to:

Places

In the United States
Washington Gardens (Davenport, Iowa), listed on the National Register of Historic Places
Washington Gardens (Boston), a former entertainment space
Washington Gardens, a neighborhood in Detroit, Michigan 
Washington Gardens, a neighborhood in Hampton, Virginia 
In Jamaica
Washington Gardens, a neighborhood in Kingston